10711 Pskov, provisional designation , is a dark asteroid from the middle region of the asteroid belt, approximately 13 kilometers in diameter. It was discovered on 15 October 1982, by Soviet astronomer Lyudmila Zhuravleva at the Crimean Astrophysical Observatory in Nauchnij, on the Crimean peninsula, and later named for the Russian city of Pskov.

Orbit and classification 

Pskov orbits the Sun in the central main-belt at a distance of 2.1–3.3 AU once every 4 years and 6 months (1,657 days). Its orbit has an eccentricity of 0.22 and an inclination of 12° with respect to the ecliptic. The body's observation arc begins 27 years prior to its official discovery observation, with a precovery taken at Palomar Observatory in November 1955.

Physical characteristics 

According to the survey carried out by NASA's Wide-field Infrared Survey Explorer with its subsequent NEOWISE mission, Pskov measures 13.01 kilometers in diameter, and its surface has an albedo of 0.076, which is rather typical for a carbonaceous C-type asteroid of the main-belt.

Lightcurves 

As of 2017, Pskovs rotation period, composition and shape remain unknown.

Naming 

This minor planet was named in honor of the old Russian city of Pskov, located near the border to Estonia, where Velikaya River enters Lake Peipus (Pskov lake). The city was first mentioned in the 10th century, and is now an administrative, industrial and cultural center. The official naming citation was published by the Minor Planet Center on 24 July 2002.

References

External links 
 Asteroid Lightcurve Database (LCDB), query form (info )
 Dictionary of Minor Planet Names, Google books
 Asteroids and comets rotation curves, CdR – Observatoire de Genève, Raoul Behrend
 Discovery Circumstances: Numbered Minor Planets (10001)-(15000) – Minor Planet Center
 
 

010711
Discoveries by Lyudmila Zhuravleva
Named minor planets
19821015